Anita Hendrie ( – April 15, 1940) was an American actress. She appeared in 67 silent motion pictures between 1908 and 1912, in addition to working in stock theater and vaudeville.

She was born in Philadelphia, Pennsylvania, the daughter of William Scott Hendrie and M. Louise Morton. Her father was a surgeon. Her grandfathers were John Martin, a signer of the Declaration of Independence, and painter Benjamin West.

In about 1902, she and actor/director David Miles were married, which they remained until his death.

Hendrie acted with the stock company at Forepaugh's theater in Cincinnati before moving to Salt Lake City in 1907 to perform there. In 1899, she performed in vaudeville.

Hendrie died at her home in Brooklyn at age 72 on April 15, 1940. She is interred at Milford, Connecticut.

Selected filmography

 The Helping Hand (1908) – Jessie Marshall
 The Maniac Cook (1909) – Margie the cook
 The Honor of Thieves (1909) – at dance
 Love Finds a Way (1909) – duchess
 A Sound Sleeper (1909) – an "ash" woman
 Those Boys! (1909) – the mother
 Edgar Allen Poe (1909) – the second publisher's wife
 A Wreath in Time (1909) – actress on stage/at stage door
 The Golden Louis (1909) – mother or old woman
 The Criminal Hypnotist (1909) – party guest
 The Road to the Heart (1909) – Miguel's wife
 Trying to Get Arrested (1909) – assaulted woman
 A Rude Hostess (1909) — gentleman burglar
 Schneider's Anti-Noise Crusade — violinist
 The Fascinating Mrs. Francis (1909) – young man's father
 Mr. Jones Has a Card Party (1909) –  a guest
 The Lonely Villa (1909) – the maid
 The Welcome Burglar (1909) – in office
 The Cord of Life (1909) – in tenement
 The Girls and Daddy (1909) – in the post office
 The Brahma Diamond (1909) – as a tourist
 Tragic Love (1909) – the landlady/the thieves' accomplice/in the factory
 His Wife's Mother (1909)
 The Roue's Heart (1909)
 I Did It (1909)
 The Deception (1909)
 And a Little Child Shall Lead Them (1909)
 Two Memories (1909)
 Lady Helen's Escapade (1909) (erroneously credited as Anita Henrie)

References

External links

1940 deaths
American film actresses
American silent film actresses
20th-century American actresses
Burials in Connecticut
Actresses from Philadelphia
1860s births
American stage actresses
Vaudeville performers